The Intent is a 2016 British crime thriller film directed by, written by and starring Femi Oyeniran.

Plot
A small-time criminal called Hoodz finds success robbing stores and small businesses, finally catches the jackpot by attacking a big drug dealer for his stash of money and drugs. Gunz, an undercover police officer posing as a member in his squad, is failing to make regular contact to his commanding officers and is increasingly becoming extremely content with the idea of being one of the members in Hoodz' crew. The police begin to view him as a suspect like all the rest.

Cast

Prequel
A prequel titled The Intent 2: The Come Up was released in 2018.

References

External links
 

2016 films
2016 crime thriller films
British crime thriller films
British independent films
Police detective films
2016 directorial debut films
Films about drugs
Black British cinema
Black British mass media
Black British films
Hood films
Films shot in London
Films set in London
2016 independent films
2010s English-language films
2010s American films
2010s British films